The HQ-7 is a short-range surface-to-air missile (SAM) from the People's Republic of China. It was developed by the Changfeng Electromechanical Technology Design Institute from the French R-440 Crotale SAM. It entered service in the early 1980s.

A ground battery consists of a short-range radar and three launchers. Each launcher has four or eight missiles.

Variants

HQ-7A
Original command-guided version.
HHQ-7
Naval variant.
HQ-7B
Improved version.
FM-80
Export version of the HQ-7A.
FM-90
Export version of the HQ-7B.
FM-90N
Naval variant of the FM-90.

Operators 

 
FM-90.
 
Bangladesh Army: FM-90
Bangladesh Air Force: FM-90
Bangladesh Navy: FM-90N and HHQ-7.
 
HQ-7A, HQ-7B and HHQ-7.
 
FM-80.
 
FM-90 and FM-90N.
 
FM-90.

References

Sources

Surface-to-air missiles of the People's Republic of China
Naval surface-to-air missiles
Military equipment introduced in the 1980s